The Committee for a Workers' International (CWI) was an international association of Trotskyist political parties. Today, two groups claim to be the continuation of the CWI.

History

Founding
The origins of the CWI can be traced to a group of British trotskyists which were expelled from the USFI in 1965, after disagreements regarding the Colonial Revolution, Gurrilerism, Studentism and the post war boom. But it is not till 1974 that they set about building an international.
The founding conference of the CWI was held in London on 20 to 21 April 1974 and attended by supporters of what was then called Militant (or the Militant tendency), from 12 countries including Britain, Ireland and Sweden. In the early years of the international, sections generally pursued a policy of entryism into social democratic or labour parties. As such, the CWI was originally secretive because to organise openly risked the expulsion of its sections from the parties in which they were working.

End of entryism
The CWI largely ended its strategy of entryism in the early 1990s. The international developed an analysis that many social democratic parties had fundamentally changed in nature and become outright capitalist parties, their main example being the UK Labour Party. This was strongly resisted by Ted Grant, one of Militant's founders. After a lengthy debate and special conference in 1991 confirmed overwhelmingly the position of the CWI in the England and Wales section, Grant and his supporters sought official faction status within the organisation, which was granted for some time, but later was revoked by the leadership. Ted Grant and his supporters were expelled and founded the International Marxist Tendency.

Since their Open Turn CWI sections have, in a number of countries, stood candidates under their own name. One section has representation in a state parliament, the Socialist Party, which at its height had three TDs in Dáil Éireann in the Republic of Ireland. The CWI also has elected members in a number of regional legislatures or local councils in Sweden; (Germany) (members of The Left); Pakistan; Sri Lanka; and the United States, where Socialist Alternative elected Kshama Sawant to Seattle City Council in 2013 and again in 2015. In the 2005 Sri Lankan presidential elections the CWI affiliate, the United Socialist Party, came third (with 0.4%).

Supporters of the CWI launched a youth organisation, International Socialist Resistance, in 2001.

New mass workers' parties
CWI members played a leading role in founding the Scottish Socialist Party. However, the SSP broke with the CWI in 1999, with a minority of members loyal to the CWI establishing the International Socialists. When Tommy Sheridan resigned from the SSP in 2006 and established a new party in Scotland, Solidarity, the International Socialists joined in conjunction with the Socialist Workers Party.

CWI members stood as National Conscience Party candidates in the 2003 Nigerian legislative elections, winning 0.51% of the national vote. In Germany CWI members have been active in the new WASG since its foundation in 2004 and in December 2005 were elected part of the new leadership of its Berlin district that ran candidates on a clear anti-cuts programme in the 2006 Berlin regional election, gaining 3.1% and several borough council seats, but the Berlin WASG later merged into Die Linke. In Brazil, CWI members helped found the
P-SOL Socialism and Liberty Party after left wing parliamentarians were expelled from the PT.

In the 2011 Irish general election the CWI's Irish affiliate, the Socialist Party won two seats in the Dáil as a part of the wider left group, the United Left Alliance which won five seats in total in Dáil Éireann. However, one of the elected members of the Socialist Party has since left the party to continue as an independent. In the by-election in Dublin West in 2014, the Socialist Party gained a second seat in the Dáil again, and a third seat in the 2014 Dublin South-West by-election as part of the Anti-Austerity Alliance.

Split 

In 2018 and 2019, a dispute developed in around the questions of socialism and identity politics, the role of the trade unions and the working-class movement, and under what programme and how Marxists should organise internationally and domestically. This led to a multifaceted split. The dispute divided the leading bodies of the CWI, with International Secretariat and International Executive Committee taking conflicting positions.

One group, which had founded the “In Defence of a Working Class and Trotskyist CWI” (IDWCTCWI) faction in November 2018 in support of the CWI's International Secretariat, declared in July 2019 that they had refounded the CWI.

A second group, in support of the majority of the CWI's International Executive Committee, declared itself the CWI Majority in August 2019 and renamed itself International Socialist Alternative on 1 February 2020. It asserted that the CWI had not dissolved but that the IDWCTCWI had split from the CWI.

A third group, which had split from the IDWCTCWI earlier, declared it had left the CWI entirely and formed International Revolutionary Left in July 2019.

Structure

Sections

{|class="wikitable" style="text-align:left;"
|-
!Section
!Name
!English Translation
!Alignment
|-
|
|Socialist Action (formerly the Socialist Party)
|
|IS
|-
|
|Sozialistische LinksPartei
Sozialistische Offensive
|Socialist Left PartySocialist Offensive
|ISACWI (2019)
|-
|
|Linkse Socialistische Partij / Parti Socialiste de Lutte
|Left Socialist Party / Socialist Party of Struggle
|ISA  
|-
|
|Liberdade, Socialismo e Revolução
|Freedom, Socialism and Revolution
|ISA 
|-
|
|Socialist Alternative
|
|ISA
|-
|
|Socialismo Revolucionario
|Revolutionary Socialism
|CWI (2019)
|-
|
|中国劳工论坛
Zhōngguó Láogōng Lùntán
|China Worker Forum
|ISA 
|-
|  Cyprus
|Νέα Διεθνιστική Αριστερά / Yeni Enternasyonalist Sol
Nea Diethnistike Aristera
|New Internationalist Left
|IS 
|-
|
|Socialistická alternativa Budoucnost
|Socialist Alternative Future
|ISA 
|-
| and 
|Socialist PartySocialist Alternative
|
|CWI (2019)ISA 
|-
|
|Gauche révolutionnaire
|Revolutionary Left
|CWI (2019)
|-
|
|Sozialistische Alternative (SAV)
Sozialistische Organisation Solidarität -
(Sol)Offensiv
|Socialist Alternative 
Socialist Organisation SolidarityOffensive
|ISACWI (2019)IRL
|-
|
|Ξεκίνημα
Xekinima
|Start
|IS
|-
|
|社會主義行動
Sekuizyuji =Haangdung
|Socialist Action
|ISA 
|-
|
|New Socialist Alternative
|
|CWI (2019)
|-
| Ireland(Republic and North)
|Socialist Party / Páirtí Sóisialach
Militant Left
RISE
|
|ISACWI (2019)N/A
|-
| and 
|
Ma'avak Sotzialisti / Harakat a-Nidal al-Ishtiraki
|Socialist Struggle
|ISA 
|-
|
|Resistenze Internazionali
|International Resistance
|ISA 
|-
|
|Militant Côte d'Ivoire
|Militant Ivory Coast
|ISA 
|-
|
|Sosialis Alternatif
|Socialist Alternative
|CWI (2019)
|-
|
|Aternativa Socialista México
|Socialist Alternative Mexico
|ISA
|-
|
|Socialistisch Alternatief
|Socialist Alternative
|ISA 
|-
|
|Democratic Socialist Movement
Movement for a Socialist Alternative
Revolutionary Socialist Movement 
|
|CWI (2019)
ISA
IS
|-
|
|Alternatywa Socjalistyczna
|Socialist Alternative
|ISA 
|-
|
|Socialismo Revolucionário
|Revolutionary Socialism
|IRL
|-
| Quebec
|Alternative socialiste
|Socialist Alternative
|ISA 
|-
|
|Mâna de Lucru
|Hand of Labour
|ISA 
|-
|
|Социалистическая Альтернатива
Socialisticheskaya Alternativa
|Socialist Alternative
|ISA 
|-
|
|Socialist Party Scotland
|
|CWI (2019)
|-
|
|Workers and Socialist Party (WASP)
Marxist Workers Party

|
|ISA
<li>CWI (2019)
|-
|
|Izquierda Revolucionaria
|Revolutionary Socialism
|IRL
|-
|
|එක්සත් සමාජවාදි පකෂය / ஐக்கிய சோசலிச கட்சி
Eksath Samajavadi Pakshaya / Aikkiy Cōcalic Kaṭci
|United Socialist Party
|CWI (2019)
|-
|
|
al-Badil al-Ishtiraki
|Socialist Alternative
|ISA 
|-
|
|Rättvisepartiet Socialisterna
|Socialist Justice Party
|ISA 
|-
|
|國際社會主義前進
Guójì Shèhuì Zhǔyì Qiánjìn
| International Socialist Forward
|IS 
|-
|
|
al-Badil al-Ishtiraki
|Socialist Alternative
|ISA 
|-
|
|Sosyalist Alternatif
|Socialist Alternative
|IS 
|-
|
|<li>Socialist Alternative
<li> Independent Socialist Group 
|
|<li>ISA 
<li>CWI (2019)

|-
|
|Izquierda Revolucionaria
|Revolutionary Socialism
|IRL
|}

Associated organisations
Youth against Racism in Europe

See also
List of Trotskyist internationals
Revolutionary socialism

References

External links
A history of the CWI 
A selection of documents arising from the 2019 split - A selection of documents from both sides of the 2019 debate
Continuing the Fight for International Socialism - ISA perspective on the split.